Nisha Dahiya is an Indian wrestler. She competed at the 2021 U23 World Wrestling Championships, winning the bronze medal in the women's freestyle 65 kg event. She competed at the 2022 World Wrestling Championships in the women's freestyle 68 kg event, losing in the bronze medal match.

In November 2021 it was erroneously reported that Dahiya had been killed, after a different wrestler of the same name was shot.

References

External links 

Living people
Place of birth missing (living people)
Year of birth missing (living people)
Indian female sport wrestlers